Wilhelm Franz Josef Beiglböck (10 October 1905 – 22 November 1963) was an internist and held the title of Consulting Physician to the German Luftwaffe (Airforce) during World War II.

Beiglböck attended Stiftsgymnasium Melk and studied medicine at the university of Vienna. During his studies there he became active in Wiener  Burschenschaft Moldavia. 
First he worked as an assistant at the Medical University Clinic in Vienna for Franz Chvostek junior and afterwards for Hans Eppinger.

From 1933 he was a member of the Nazi Party and from 1934 of SA, promoted to the rank of Obersturmbannführer (Lieutenant Colonel). In 1939 he made his habilitation and in 1940 he became top doctor under Hans Eppinger. From May 1941 Beiglböck worked as Stabsarzt (medical officer) of the Luftwaffe. In 1944, he became an extrabudgetary professor at the Vienna University. During the war he performed medical tests involving seawater on inmates at Dachau concentration camp.

After the war, Beiglböck was arrested by the British, who then transferred him to U.S. custody. He was a defendant in the Nuremberg Doctor's Trial. Beiglböck was convicted of war crimes and crimes against humanity, and sentenced to 15 years in prison. Beiglböck's sentence was commuted to 10 years in January 1951, and he was released from prison that December.

In early 1947, the Vienna prosecution initiated proceedings against Beiglböck because of war crimes, mistreatment, and violating human rights. The Vienna proceedings were finished in October 1947.

Since Beiglböck's license to practice medicine had not been revoked, he was allowed to resume working as a doctor. After his release, he was controversially given a temporary job at the University of Freiburg hospital. Beiglböck then got a job at the Buxtehude Hospital, where he became the head physician of the internal medicine department.

The German Society of Internal Medicine (DGIM) campaigned for Beiglböck's rehabilitation. A three-member commission was formed to address Beiglböck's conviction. Multiple other prominent DGIM members sought to exonerate him via expert opinions and statements. The expert opinions relied on the standards established by the Nuremberg trials. However, all but one of the experts assumed that the test subjects had been volunteers. The experts claimed no deaths or long-term damage had occurred among the test subjects, and that Beiglböck had acted with the best medical intentions. The opinions were based entirely on files submitted to the experts by Beiglböck's attorney. None of the experts had seen any of the test subjects themselves, and most of them had never met Beiglböck.

In 1956, Beiglböck was elected to the DGIM committee, where he served until 1962. In 1959, the public prosecutor in Bückeburg opened a new investigation against Beiglböck, but dropped the case in 1960. In 1962, the Austrian Medical Association invited to Beiglböck to give a medical lecture in Vienna. This was met with opposition from the Social Democratic Party of Austria and the local Jewish community. The administrative committee of the city of Buxtehude, supported Beiglböck, and said he was not guilty of the crimes for which he had been convicted. However, his invitation was rescinded.

In 1963, Beiglböck was found dead in a stairwell. Stille Hilfe, a relief organization for the SS, was his official heir. The circumstances of Beiglböck's death remain unclear. It is rumored that he was murdered, as he had received threatening letters prior to his death.

Beiglböck's supporters continued to claim that the prisoners had volunteered for his experimented, and that he had been completely exonerated by the DGIM. During Beiglböck's funeral, a state physician representative said that "after the war he was caught up in a wheelwork of hatred that knew no justice." "Today his research during the Nazi period is being continued in the U.S. A West German newspaper reported that while Beiglböck's "innocence was clearly proven by the statements of those involved and by scientific expert opinions, most recently by that of the highest professional body in the Federal Republic, the Deutschen Gesellschaft für innere Medizin, and Professor Beiglböck was fully rehabilitated, these matters were taken up again last year by trying to prevent a lecture before the Vienna Medical Chamber. Professor Beiglböck suffered greatly from this defamation, since he saw Vienna as his home, not only as a human being but also as a scientist, to which he was thus denied access."

During a meeting in Wiesbaden in 1964, a DGIM official declared that "Wilhelm Beiglböck was a true student of Eppinger. Rich in fruitful thoughts. His brilliant rise at the Vienna Clinic was abruptly and undeservedly interrupted by the misfortune of his detachment to carry out the so-called seawater experiments. It must be said again at this point that the review of these experiments by a commission of the Deutsche Gesellschaft für innere Medizin, chaired by Mr. Oehme, absolved him of any guilt. Beiglböck deserves our full recognition and veneration as a human being, physician, and researcher."

References 

 Alexander Mitscherlich / Fred Mielke: Medizin ohne Menschlichkeit - Dokumente des Nürnberger Ärzteprozesses, Lamberg und Schneider, Heidelberg 1949, .
 : Das Personenlexikon zum Dritten Reich - Wer war was vor und nach 1945. S. Fischer, Frankfurt a.M. 2003, .
 : Croix gammée contre caducée. Les expériences humaines en Allemagne pendant la deuxième guerre mondiale. Neustadt 1950.

1905 births
1963 deaths
People from Wiener Neustadt-Land District
Physicians in the Nazi Party
Sturmabteilung officers
Austrian Nazis convicted of war crimes
Austrian people convicted of crimes against humanity
Dachau concentration camp personnel
Nazi human subject research
People convicted by the United States Nuremberg Military Tribunals
Prisoners and detainees of the British military
20th-century Austrian physicians
Luftwaffe personnel convicted of war crimes